English Law, English Bill, English Act, or variation, may refer to:

 Law of the United Kingdom
 English law, the law of England and Wales
 Common law, the body of laws descended from England
 Legal English, the specialized English used in courts of law and legal writing
 English Bill (1858), a bill proposed by William Hayden English in the United States Congress
 English Language Unity Act, the bill introduced to define English as the official language of the United States
 Charter of the French Language (Bill 101), the act of law banning and proscribing uses of English in Quebec
 Pleading in English Act 1362, the law of England making English instead of courtly French the language of the courts of England
 The secular laws of jurisdictions in which Amish communities exist ("English" being the non-Amish), see Amish life in the modern world

See also
 Lawrence English (born 1976) Australian composer
 Bill English (born 1961) New Zealand Prime Minister
 William English (disambiguation) for others 'Bill English'
 English (disambiguation)